Umm al-Ḥawair is a settlement in northern Qatar, located in the municipality of Ash Shamal.

Etymology
In Arabic, "umm" translates to mother and is used at the beginning of place names to ascribe an area with a particular geographic feature. "Hawa'ir" is derived from the Arabic term "hawaya", roughly translating to "to consist of". This name was bestowed on it due to the area consisting of numerous geographic features, such as a rawda, a well and several hills.

References

Populated places in Al Shamal